The Journal of Clinical Nursing (also known as JCN) is a monthly peer-reviewed medical journal covering all aspects of nursing. It is published by John Wiley & Sons.

History
The journal was established in 1990 with Christine Webb as founding editor-in-chief. Subsequent editors-in-chief were Roger Watson and Debra Jackson. The current editor-in-chief is Mark Hayter, of the Manchester Metropolitan University.

Abstracting and indexing
The journal is abstracted and indexed in:

According to the Journal Citation Reports, the journal has a 2021 impact factor of 4.423.

References

External links

Publications established in 1990
General nursing journals
Wiley (publisher) academic journals
Monthly journals
English-language journals